Baptist Lui Ming Choi Secondary School (BLMCSS) is a secondary school in Sha Tin, Hong Kong, near Lek Yuen Estate. It was established in 1978 by the Hong Kong Baptist Convention. Situated in the new town of Sha Tin, the school is a co-educational grammar school offering education at the first to sixth form levels education in Hong Kong. English is the major medium of instruction whereas Cantonese are used for subjects like Chinese Language, Chinese History, Chinese Literature, Liberal Studies, Visual Arts, Physical Education. In junior forms, Mandarin Chinese is also taught. The school has mission in providing an all-round education based on Christian values by nurturing their moral, intellectual, physical, social, aesthetic and spiritual skills, knowledge and attitude. It is a band 1 school.

Educational Values and Beliefs 

2W

Whole-Person Development: To self, family, studies and careers, people, society, country, world and mankind, and God

Whole School Approach: Academics, Guidance and Discipline, Activity, Gospel.

School ethos

Under the Hong Kong Baptist Convention, the school was founded by the Lui Ming Choi Foundation. It is one of the five secondary schools operating under the supervision of the Convention. The School’s motto is "明道致知" in Chinese, derived from the idea of Zhu Xi, a Confucianist in Song Dynasty and incorporated this into Christian belief, which means understanding God’s teachings to become wise and intellectual. This concludes the expectation for its graduates.

Though the School holds the spread of the Gospel to be one of its missions, the atmosphere is relatively open and liberal, not only in the religious aspect, but also the socio-political. Till to date, the School and its Student Union hold memorial service and activities concerning the Tiananmen Square protests and June Fourth Movement which happened in mainland China, 1989.

Campus

Situated at the bank of Shing Mun River, the campus development is restrained. Nonetheless, the school extended the new wing in 1999 and undertook renovation and classroom reshuffle in order to facilitate the setting up of its multimedia laboratory and language laboratory. In the construction plan, a roof garden was included. The building of garden expanded the very limited space in where casual activities or even relaxation for students and staff could be taken place. Apart from classrooms and congregation hall, the school equips with science laboratories, playgrounds, rooms for various kinds of art, language and multimedia facilities for modern education. The school applied to Education Bureau (EDB) in 2007 for a new campus site reserved under the Kowloon-Canton Railway Corporation Tai Wai Maintenance Centre Property Development Project, but lost to Shatin Tsung Tsin Secondary School. In February 2015, the construction project of a new annex was approved by the Financial Committee of the Legco. The Project commenced on 28 December 2015 and will be finished in 2018. The government burdened around 150 million dollars for the construction project.

Education reform of Hong Kong
Witnessing the vast change brought by the education reform in Hong Kong, the school was transformed to fit into the new environment and well preserve its teaching and learning quality. The new curriculum with new highlight on social science and liberal studies will be introduced. Syllabi for public examination for the entrance of university will soon be revised to catch the structural change of Hong Kong's educational system, from seven years secondary education to six years whilst one more year will be added to tertiary education.

The school has a strong structure bounding both internally and externally. The 3 main internal bodies, the Parents' Association, the Alumni Association and the Student Union, engage intimately in various aspects of school operations. Externally, the School has strong linkages with secondary schools over the city and educational institutions. In 2004, the Education and Manpower Bureau named the school as one of the twenty school tiding direct partnership with the best 20 in mainland China.

Lectures
The school has hosted former Chief Secretary for Administration Anson Chan, President of the Legislative Council of Hong Kong Jasper Tsang, and entrepreneur Joseph Lee for lectures. In 2015, the school hosted Joshua Wong to speak about politics and civil disobedience which caused a group of parents to protest outside the school that Wong was teaching their students to violate the law.

Class structure

Like most other secondary schools in Hong Kong, Baptist Lui Ming Choi Secondary School serves form 1 through form 6. Form 1 to 3 are Junior classes; 4 to 6 are Certificate.
Junior classes studies subjects of all streams like languages, computer, arts, science, sports and many others. As a Christian school, studied of bible is included in the curriculum. Certificate classes are targeted at the HKCEE, an open certificate examination for secondary education. Students are divided into arts, business or science stream according to their interests.

From the academic year 2009, the Form 4 class will be ceased, and those classes will be replaced into NS1, NS2 and NS3 respectively to complying with the Hong Kong Diploma of Secondary Education.

Extracurricular activities
The School traditionally accommodates an active student body. Students participate widely in programmes and competitions of sports, music, performing arts, technological innovation and so on. There are more than 80 extracurricular activities students, most numerous options among schools in Hong Kong. Numerous students secured prestigious awards like Sir Edward Youde Memorial Scholarship in Hong Kong.

Baptist Lui Ming Choi Secondary School boasts as one of the HK secondary schools with the largest variety of extracurricular activities for students to participate in, with particular strengths in sports, drama, and music. Many prizes have been awarded to the students of BLMCSS. Below is a list of student clubs:

Student Union
Academic Societies: Art Society, Design and Technology Society (Robotics Team), Home Economics Society, Europe Club, Bridge Club, Mathematics Society, Magic Club, Geography Society, Music Society, English Society, Chinese Society, Biology Society etc.
Service: Boy Scouts, Girl Guides, Red Cross, Peer Support Scheme, Stage Support team, CampusTV, Prefect etc.
Sports: PE Society and other ball teams(Football, Basketball, Handball, Volleyball, Badminton, Table Tennis), Folk Dance Club, Jazz Dance Club, Oriental Dance Club, Latin Dance Club
Music: Music Society, and more than 30 different instrument class, including both Western and Chinese instruments
Drama: Drama Club (Drama is a compulsory academic subject for F.1 students)

Student union
The Baptist Lui Ming Choi Secondary School Student Union (also known as BLMCSSSU or LMCSU) has the longest history in its sort among schools in the East New Territories. Formed in 1983, the students' union has been playing a key role in students' activities, as well as external involvement. Departments of the Union organise ranges of programme and activity to enhance learning experience and campus life. It also connects the student population with other schools' fellows through joint schools functions and friendly dialogues.

The Union is a democratic organisation which consists of two main bodies: the Executive Committee, which is the cabinet executing mandated power, and the Representative Council, holding power of amending the Constitution of the Union, passing working plans, budgets, approving reports, debate and vote on Committee proposals. In principle, the Committee and the Council cooperate to enact and push forward any proposals and plans. The principal acts as the President-in-Nomine. 2 to 3 teaching staff are assigned by the Principal to be Advisors to supervise and guide the operation of the Union, who are seen to be real supervisors. The Committee coordinates working schedule and details with Advisors' consent, though not bounded in the Constitution.

Counselors are elected once a year. There is one seat for every class, therefore 31 in total. The method adopted is simple majority and monitored by the class teacher at the academic year commencement in September. Nomination is open to all in the class except members in any proposed cabinet(s) in the Committee election. Generally, most senior will seek incumbency and have sort of association with proposed cabinet(s) to complete the political system of the Union.

Alumni
Due to the influence of the serving culture in their alma mater, alumni are observed in facets of social commitment. Large portion of graduates pitched themselves into education, some of them in academic research. Similarly large portion achieved qualification in professions like legal, medical services, and engineering business.

Student Support
Whole School Approach to Catering for Student Diversity:
Differentiated instructions are implemented to cater for learner diversity. Split classes and remedial classes are offered in junior secondary English lessons to
cater for their learning differences. Also, there are variations in the curriculum content and teaching strategies of the different curriculum
sets to accommodate different abilities, skills, learning paces and styles of students. Through a wide range of learning activities including F.1 Summer Bridging Camp and afterschool tuition groups, students ’diverse learning needs are catered, and so they have become more motivated to learn.

Notable alumni
 Moon Lau, an actress under TVB management

See also
 Education in Hong Kong

References

External links

 
 Baptist Lui Ming Choi Secondary School
 The Baptist Convention of Hong Kong
 Baptist Lui Ming Choi Primary School
 Baptist (Sha Tin Wai) Lui Ming Choi Primary School

Protestant secondary schools in Hong Kong
Sha Tin
Educational institutions established in 1978
1978 establishments in Hong Kong